Ella Chen Chia-hwa (born 18 June 1981) is a Taiwanese singer, actress, and television host. She is a member of the Taiwanese girl group S.H.E.

Career 

On 8 August 2000, HIM International Music held a 'Universal 2000 Talent and Beauty Girl Contest' in search of new artists to sign under their label. When she traveled with her sister to Taipei for a holiday, Ella discovered that her older sister had registered her for a singing competition. Intimidated by the long line of contestants and worried of facing ridicule for her tomboy personality, Ella almost gave up before the first round. Her older sister, however, convinced her to stay. Ella's deep voice caught the label's attention, and then she reached the final round. Her alto voice was noted for its strong and beautiful nature.

Following the conclusion of the contest, Ella returned to her duties at a local hospital, but received a call from HIM International requesting an additional audition. After test recordings were done, Ella signed on as part of HIM's newest girl group, S.H.E. Her name 'Ella', which means courage, is derived from a personality test set by HIM Management Co. When Ella first tested out her signature, HIM employees were concerned that the signature would be easily forged due to its simplicity; thus, during S.H.E's early days, Ella signed autographs using the last character of her name,. However, as S.H.E's autograph sessions drew larger audiences, Ella reverted to her simpler, English signature.

During her career with S.H.E, Ella has been the most accident-prone member. On 29 July 2003, she was sent to the hospital after jumping from the third story of a building and injuring her spine while filming a variety program as the two other members refused to jump. She returned three weeks later to promote Super Star. In 2005, during the filming of Reaching for the Stars, Ella burned her ears and hair on a candle, prompting crew members to send her to the National Taiwan University Hospital. To recover, Ella stayed away from filming for two days, during which she cut off approximately two centimeters of burnt hair on both sides of her head.

In 2007, Chen was voted by online fans as Taiwan's most down-to-earth (unpretentious) artist. Out of the three members of S.H.E, Ella is the most outspoken. Since the release of S.H.E's first album in 2001, Ella has usually been the one to answer reporter's questions. As the tomboy of S.H.E, Ella is frequently the subject of jokes targeting her gender and sexual orientation, but she usually takes the jabs in stride. Netizens even labelled her one of China's Four Main Tomboys of the past century. Her unusually deep voice earned her a starring role as the voice of Arthur in the Mandarin version of Arthur and the Minimoys.

In 2003, Ella starred in a drama series The Rose with Joe Cheng and Jerry Huang and gave her the title of one of the best and most popular drama actress after the mediocre success of Magical Love with Blue Lan. The drama was voted the Most Popular Drama in Golden Bell Awards.

In 2005, Ella did a drama series with her S.H.E group mates Reaching for the Stars and once again, she proved that she can act very well as she was the only member nominated as Best Lead Actress in 41st Golden Bell Awards considering the fact that the three of them were the leads of the said drama.

In 2006, Ella accepted a drama series that sealed the deal that she was indeed one of the idol drama queens in Taiwan. Hanazakarino Kimitachihe gained extraordinary fame and made her team-up with Wu Chun a loveteam to beat. The popularity reached other Asian countries such as China, Hong Kong, Singapore, Malaysia and even in the non-Chinese speaking countries like Philippines, Thailand, Vietnam, Cambodia, USA and some European countries.

2010 marked Ella's return to the drama series arena when with Jerry Yan, she led the cast of Down With Love. Again, she showed an undeniable strength to draw a large number of audience because of its success despite of being leaked before the 3rd episode was aired.

In 2012, Ella started to venture into the big screen in her first full-length film New Perfect Two alongside Vic Zhou and was immediately followed by another equally successful movie Bad Girls with Mike He. Bad Girls theme song was interpreted by Ella herself and became the carrier single of her first commercial mini album entitled To Be Ella/I am Chen Jia Hua which topped the charts all over Asia and gained various praises from the critics and nominations from different award giving bodies on the same year.

As a singer and an actress, Ella has also appeared in various music videos such as 愛的重唱曲-覆水難收篇 (2004-04-05), 再一次拥有 (2005) by Kaira Gong and 愛到瘋癲 (2009) by Power Station.

In 2009, Ella composed a song for her seniors Power Station, entitled "Love Crazy/愛到瘋癲" (originally titled Shi Mian/Insomnia, written after her failed heartbreaking relationship). The song was given to them as repayment for Power Station have given S.H.E the song "Freezer". Ella had also composed a station song entitled "Pop Radio 91.7 jingle" for Taiwan Pop Radio station "Pop Radio 91.7," 再这里 for Huang Yi Da, 鸟 for Yao Yao.

In 2013, Ella filmed a Chinese New Year Drama in Shanghai entitled Ji Pin Da Zuo Zhan which required her to film one month straight as she went back and forth from Taiwan to Shanghai, from Shanghai to Taiwan to fulfill her group activities in her home country.

Chen also hosted a dating show Take Me Out with Harlem Yu which began airing on 13 April 2013. She was nominated for Best Entertainment TV Show Host along with Yu at the 49th Golden Bell Awards.

Chen was a judge in Season 2 of the Chinese reality singing television show, Masked Singer.

Chen was a vocal mentor on Produce 101 China, which aired in 2018. In 2020, Chen joined Season 2 of the Chinese survival show, Youth With You, otherwise also known as Idol Producer Season 3, as a vocal coach along with Cai Xukun, Lisa and Jony J.

Personal life 
In October 2016, Chen announced that she was 6 weeks pregnant with her first child with her husband, Alvin Lai, who is Malaysian. Their child, a boy, was born on 12 April 2017.
She first revealed her son nine months after his birth on social media. He later appeared at S.H.E 17th anniversary concert as a surprise guest.

Discography

Studio albums 
Why Not – released 17 April 2015

Extended plays 
Qiang Qiang – released 27 August 2007.
To Be Ella – released 30 March 2012.
Me vs. Me – released 28 October 2016
Ella Show - Entertainment Unlimited Company – released 16 November 2020

Solo / duet 
单手超人 (Dān Shǒu Chāorén / Single-handed Superman) 
我就是我 (Wǒ Jiù Shì Wǒ / I Am Just Me) – A self-penned and self-composed song she made for her Solo Performance in the S.H.E Is The One Concert Tour.
跟月亮Say Goodbye (Gēn Yuèliàng Say Goodbye / Say Goodbye with the Moon) – Solo – unreleased but leaked around April 2010.
你被寫在我的歌裡 (Nǐ Bèi Xiě Zài Wǒ De Gē Li / You're To Write in My Songs) – Duet with Wu Qing-feng – was the featured artist in What Is Troubling You Album by Sodagreen, released 11 November 2011.
別 (Bie / Don't) – A solo in Girl's Dorm
偷偷愛著你 (Tou Tou Ai Zhe Ni / Secretly in Love with You) – Opening theme song of Hana Kimi, but 'Zen Me Ban' was chosen. It was used as a jingle for Pop Radio 2011.
NTC – NIKE 2012 Be Amazing Movement declaration song
熱水澡  (Re Shui Zao / Hot Bath) – Commercial single from the original song for Stanley Huang's Leng Shui Zao.
你好，疯子 (Ni Hao, Feng Zi / Hello Crazy) – Single by Ella Chen from the title of the movie with the same name.
真的我 (Zhen De Wo) - Ending Theme Song for Taiwan Drama 謊言遊戲 (The Lying Game) 
我的寶 My Baby (Wo De Bao, My Baby / My Treasure, My Baby)終於愛情 Finally in Love (Zhong Yu Ai Qing) – Theme song for the movie, 脫單告急 (Dude's Manual)
Anytime is Happy Time - Commercial single for Taiwan Beer
心不名狀 Inexplicable (Xin Bu Ming Zhuang) - Theme Song for the movie, 大三元 (Big Three Dragon)
都幾歲了 How Old Are You (Dou Ji Sui Le) - Theme Song for the Taiwan GTV drama, 幸福一家人 (The Family)
囉哩叭唆 Stop Nagging (Luo Li Ba Suo)晚安歌 Good Night (Wan An Ge)''

Filmography

Television series

Film

Variety show

Music videos

References

External links

 
 
 
 
 
 
 Ella Chen at HIM International Music 
 S.H.E at HIM International Music 

 
1981 births
Living people
People from Pingtung County
S.H.E members
Taiwanese people of Hakka descent
People from Meixian District
Taiwanese television actresses
Taiwanese film actresses
Hakka musicians
Participants in Chinese reality television series
Taiwanese idols
21st-century Taiwanese actresses
21st-century Taiwanese singers
21st-century Taiwanese women singers